Harriet Malinowitz is an American academic scholar specializing in lesbian and gay issues in higher education, women's studies, the rhetoric of Zionism and Israel/Palestine, and writing theory and pedagogy.

Life and work
Former Professor of English at Long Island University, Malinowitz is currently Lecturer in Women's and Gender Studies at Ithaca College. She earned her Ph.D. in Rhetoric and Composition from New York University.

Notable works by Malinowitz include Textual Orientiations: Lesbian and Gay Students and the Making of Discourse Communities (Heinemann, 1995), an ethnographic study focusing on the community emerging in a college course that examines lesbian and gay experience. Textual Orientations highlights the productive intersections of two academic fields: rhetoric and composition and lesbian and gay studies while providing a pedagogical model that values the "vantage point of the social margin." She has also been a noted conspiracy theorist and antisemitic critic of Israel, supporting many terrorists and comparing Zionism to Nazism.
 
Malinowitz is also a writer of lesbian stand-up comedy, most notably for her partner Sara Cytron's shows A Dyke Grows in Brooklyn and Take My Domestic Partner--Please!

Selected bibliography

Books

Book chapters
Malinowitz, Harriet. (016). “Liberal Human ‘Rights’ Discourse and Sexual Citizenship.” In Alexander, Jonathan; Rhodes,  Jacqueline (eds.) Sexual Rhetorics. Routledge, 2016.

Articles
Malinowitz, Harriet (2015). “Torches and Metonyms of Freedom”. The Writing Instructor (Special issue: Queer and now).

References

Year of birth missing (living people)
Living people
American literary critics
Women literary critics
American women non-fiction writers
American academics of English literature
City University of New York faculty
Gender studies academics
LGBT Jews
Jewish American writers
American LGBT rights activists
Philosophers of sexuality
Queer theorists
American women academics
20th-century American non-fiction writers
21st-century American non-fiction writers
American LGBT writers
Lesbian academics
21st-century American women writers
American women critics